Reed Van Dyk is an American filmmaker, best known for his film, DeKalb Elementary for which he received an Academy Award for Best Live Action Short Film nomination at the 90th Academy Awards.

Filmography
 2017: DeKalb Elementary (Short) (writer, director, producer) 
 2014: nasty hardcoreXXX amateur couple (Short) (story) / (writer, director, producer) 
 2013: Hung Up (Short) (co-writer, director, producer) 
 2008: The Conservatory (Short) (writer, director, producer) 
 TBA:  Placid Universe Theory (Short) (grip) (post-production) 
 2016: ''Owen (Short) (grip) 
 2015: Christian Fellowship Players' (Short) (grip) 
 2015: F.T.E.W: For The Epic Win''' (Short) (gaffer)

References

External links
 
 DeKalb

Living people
American producers
American directors
American screenwriters
Year of birth missing (living people)